The 1992 Arkansas State Indians football team represented Arkansas State University as an independent during the 1992 NCAA Division I-A football season. Led by Ray Perkins in his first and only season as head coach, the Indians compiled a record of 2–9.

Schedule

References

Arkansas State
Arkansas State Red Wolves football seasons
Arkansas State Indians football